The 1995 Asian Women's Volleyball Championship was the eighth edition of the Asian Championship, a biennial international volleyball tournament organised by the Asian Volleyball Confederation (AVC) with Thailand Volleyball Association (TVA). The tournament was held in Chiang Mai, Thailand from 25 September to 2 October1995.

Pools composition
The teams are seeded based on their final ranking at the 1993 Asian Women's Volleyball Championship.

Preliminary round

Pool A

|}

|}

Pool B

|}

|}

Final round
 The results and the points of the matches between the same teams that were already played during the preliminary round shall be taken into account for the final round.

Classification 5th–8th

|}

|}

Championship

|}

|}

Final standing

References
Results (Archived 2009-05-11)

International volleyball competitions hosted by Thailand
1995 in women's volleyball
1995
Volleyball,Asian Women's Championship